Međeđa is a village in the municipality of Višegrad, Bosnia and Herzegovina. Međeđa is located in the Međeđa gorge, which is for the most part flooded by the water reservoir, created for the Višegrad hydroelectric power plant.

The Bosnian Eastern Railway from Sarajevo to Uvac and Vardište was built through Međeđa during the Austro-Hungarian rule in Bosnia and Herzegovina. Construction of the line started in 1903. It was completed in 1906, using the  track gauge. With the cost of 75 million gold crowns, which approximately translates to 450 thousand gold crowns per kilometer, it was one of the most expensive railways in the world built by that time.
The railway station in Međeđa operated as a junction railway station to destinations of Sarajevo, Uvac and Vardište. The extensions were built from Uvac to Priboj, and from Vardište to Belgrade in 1928. The line was closed down in 1978, and dismantled afterwards.
The site of the former railway station was flooded by the water reservoir in 1989.

References

Populated places in Višegrad